In corporate finance, mergers, venture capital, investment banking, private equity (including the leveraged buyout), and foreign direct investment, an exit is a deal for removing an ownership stake in an enterprise or temporary project. Types of exit include selling through an initial public offering or corporate acquisition, and writing off.

There is a point in the investment cycle where one or more investors (possibly a financial institution, small group of investors, or an individual) sells some or all of their ownership stake and takes profits. These transactions can have very different features depending on the investment assets, whether they are multi-billion dollar companies, or other more purely-financial entities.

References

Investment
Selling techniques
Finance
Venture capital
Private equity and venture capital investors
Private equity